Tsvetan Petkov (born 5 March 1956) is a Bulgarian rower. He competed at the 1976 Summer Olympics and the 1980 Summer Olympics.

References

1956 births
Living people
Bulgarian male rowers
Olympic rowers of Bulgaria
Rowers at the 1976 Summer Olympics
Rowers at the 1980 Summer Olympics
Place of birth missing (living people)
World Rowing Championships medalists for Bulgaria